October 2013

See also

References

 10
October 2013 events in the United States